Grant Izzard (born in Penrith, New South Wales) is an Australian former professional rugby league footballer who played in the 1990s. He played for the Penrith Panthers and the Illawarra Steelers of the New South Wales Rugby League premiership. His position of choice was at centre and he is also the younger brother of rugby league player Craig Izzard.

Playing career
Izzard was a Penrith local junior who followed in the footsteps of his older brother. Following their 1991 grand final victory he travelled with the Panthers to England for the 1991 World Club Challenge which was lost to Wigan.

Lack of opportunity at his home club meant that he was forced to move on eventually signing with the Illawarra Steelers in 1993. The beginning of a new season at his new club looked promising until he was cited for biting South Sydney player Craig Field and was subsequently suspended for six weeks.  Izzard failed to regain his form or position in the first grade side.

References

Sources
 

1970 births
Living people
Australian rugby league players
Blacktown Workers players
Illawarra Steelers players
Penrith Panthers players
Rugby league centres
Rugby league players from Penrith, New South Wales